This is a list of diplomatic missions in Northern Cyprus (TRNC).

Embassies
Lefkoşa
 (Embassy)

Consulates
Gazimağusa
 (Consulate-General)

Other Offices

Foreign missions located in Lefkoşa:
 (High Commission Office)
 (Programme Support Office, EUPSO)
 (Cultural Office)
 (Embassy Office)
 (Embassy Office)
 (High Commission Office)

See also
Foreign relations of Northern Cyprus
List of diplomatic missions of Northern Cyprus

References

External links
Turkish Republic of Northern Cyprus – Ministry of Foreign Affairs
Turkish Republic of Northern Cyprus – Public Information Office

 
Diplomatic missions
Northern Cyprus
Northern Cyprus
Diplomatic missions